Desiderio Alberto Arnaz y Alberni II (March 8, 1894 – May 31, 1973) was a Cuban politician and the father of Desi Arnaz.

Early life
He was the son of Desiderio Alberto Arnaz y Alberni (1857–1929), a medical doctor (and grandson of Manuel Arnaz, a mayor of Santiago de Cuba in 1869) and Rosa Alberni y Portuondo (1870–?), a member of the Cuban nobility and the great-granddaughter of a mayor of Santiago de Cuba, José Joaquín Portuondo y Rizo, 1st Conde de Santa Inés (1762–1824).
He graduated from the Southern College of Pharmacy (merged and known now as Mercer University, School of College of Pharmacy and Health Sciences) in 1913 in Atlanta, Georgia.

Politics
Desiderio Arnaz II was the youngest mayor of Santiago de Cuba (1923–1932). He was elected to the Cuban House of Representatives in November 1932 for the Oriente Province. When president Gerardo Machado was overthrown in August 1933, Rep. Arnaz was arrested and jailed. Six months later, he was allowed to go into exile.

Personal life
He married Dolores "Lolita" de Acha y de Socias (2 April 1896—24 October 1988) in 1916 and had one son, Desiderio "Desi" Arnaz III. He later had a daughter, Connie Arnaz (10 June 1932), with Anne M. Wilson (12 June 1902—7 June 1994), whom he married in 1941.

Death
Arnaz died in 1973 in Miami and is entombed above President Machado at Caballero Rivero Woodlawn North Park Cemetery and Mausoleum.

References
 Lewiston Evening Journal; Father of Entertainer Arnaz Dies; 1 June 1973.
 Santa Cruz y Mallen, Francisco Xavier de; Historia de Familias Cubanas – Tomo Primero; Editorial Hercules, Havana, Cuba; 1940.
 Arnaz, Desi; A Book; Morrow, 1976; .

1894 births
1973 deaths
Members of the Cuban House of Representatives
Mayors of places in Cuba
Cuban emigrants to the United States
Mercer University alumni
Desiderio